The , codenamed Operation Iceberg, was a battle of the Pacific War fought on the island of Okinawa by United States Army and United States Marine Corps forces against the Imperial Japanese Army. The initial invasion of Okinawa on 1 April 1945 was the largest amphibious assault in the Pacific Theater of World War II. The Kerama Islands surrounding Okinawa were preemptively captured on 26 March by the 77th Infantry Division. The 82-day battle lasted from 1 April until 22 June 1945.

The United States created the Tenth Army, a cross-branch force consisting of the U.S. Army 7th, 27th, 77th and 96th Infantry Divisions with the 1st, 2nd, and 6th Marine Divisions, to fight on the island. The Tenth Army was unique in that it had its own Tactical Air Force (joint Army-Marine command) and was supported by combined naval and amphibious forces. Opposing the Allied forces on the ground was the Japanese Thirty-Second Army.

The battle has been referred to as the "typhoon of steel" in English, and kotetsu no ame ("rain of steel") or kotetsu no hageshi kaze ("violent wind of steel") in Japanese. The nicknames refer to the ferocity of the fighting, the intensity of Japanese kamikaze attacks and the sheer numbers of Allied ships and armored vehicles that assaulted the island. The battle was the bloodiest in the Pacific, with around 50,000 Allied and 84,166–117,000 Japanese casualties, including Okinawans conscripted into the Japanese Army. According to local authorities, at least 149,425 Okinawan people were killed, died by coerced suicide or went missing, roughly half of the estimated pre-war population of about 300,000.

In the naval operations surrounding the battle, both sides lost considerable numbers of ships and aircraft, including the Japanese battleship . After the battle, Okinawa provided a fleet anchorage, troop staging areas, and airfields in proximity to Japan for US forces, in preparation for a planned invasion of the Japanese home islands. Despite local protests, US forces remain garrisoned on Okinawa.

Order of battle

Allied

In all, the US Army had over 103,000 soldiers (of these, 38,000+ were non-divisional artillery, combat support and HQ troops, with another 9,000 service troops), over 88,000 Marines and 18,000 Navy personnel (mostly Seabees and medical personnel). At the start of the Battle of Okinawa, the US Tenth Army had 182,821 personnel under its command. It was planned that Lieutenant General Simon Bolivar Buckner Jr. would report to Vice Admiral Richmond K. Turner until the amphibious phase was completed, after which he would report directly to Admiral Raymond A. Spruance. Total aircraft in the US Navy, Marine and Army Air Force exceeded 3,000 over the course of the battle, including fighters, attack aircraft, scout planes, bombers and dive-bombers. The invasion was supported by a fleet consisting of 18 battleships, 27 cruisers, 177 destroyers/destroyer escorts, 39 aircraft carriers (11 fleet carriers, 6 light carriers and 22 escort carriers) and various support and troop transport ships.

The British naval contingent accompanied 251 British naval aircraft and included a British Commonwealth fleet with Australian, New Zealand and Canadian ships and personnel.

Japanese
The Japanese land campaign (mainly defensive) was conducted by the 67,000-strong (77,000 according to some sources) regular 32nd Army and some 9,000 Imperial Japanese Navy troops at Oroku Naval Base (only a few hundred of whom had been trained and equipped for ground combat), supported by 39,000 drafted local Ryukyuan people (including 24,000 hastily drafted rear militia called Boeitai and 15,000 non-uniformed laborers). The Japanese had used kamikaze tactics since the Battle of Leyte Gulf, but for the first time they became a major part of the defense. Between the American landing on 1 April and 25 May, seven major kamikaze attacks were attempted, involving more than 1,500 planes.

The 32nd Army initially consisted of the 9th, 24th and 62nd Divisions and the 44th Independent Mixed Brigade. The 9th Division was moved to Taiwan before the invasion, resulting in shuffling of Japanese defensive plans. Primary resistance was to be led in the south by Lieutenant General Mitsuru Ushijima, his chief of staff, Lieutenant General Isamu Chō and his chief of operations, Colonel Hiromichi Yahara. Yahara advocated a defensive strategy, whilst Chō advocated an offensive one.

In the north, Colonel Takehido Udo was in command. The naval troops were led by Rear Admiral Minoru Ōta. They expected the Americans to land 6–10 divisions against the Japanese garrison of two and a half divisions. The staff calculated that superior quality and numbers of weapons gave each US division five or six times the firepower of a Japanese division. To this, would be added the Americans' abundant naval and air firepower.

Japanese use of children

On Okinawa, the Imperial Japanese Army mobilized 1,780 schoolboys aged 14–17 years into front line service as an Iron and Blood Imperial Corps (Tekketsu Kinnōtai :ja:鉄血勤皇隊),  while female Himeyuri students were organized into a nursing unit. This mobilization was conducted by an ordinance of the Ministry of the Army, not by law. The ordinances mobilized the students as volunteer soldiers for form's sake; in reality, the military authorities ordered schools to force almost all students to "volunteer" as soldiers; sometimes they counterfeited the necessary documents. About half of the Tekketsu Kinnōtai were killed, including in suicide bomb attacks against tanks and in guerrilla operations.

Among the 21 male and female secondary schools that made up these student corps, 2,000 students died on the battlefield. Even with the female students acting mainly as nurses to Japanese soldiers, they were still exposed to the harsh conditions of war.

Naval battle

The US Navy's Task Force 58, deployed to the east of Okinawa with a picket group of 6 to 8 destroyers, kept 13 carriers (7 fleet carriers and 6 light carriers) on duty from 23 March to 27 April and a smaller number thereafter. Until 27 April, a minimum of 14 and up to 18 escort carriers were in the area at all times. Until 20 April, British Task Force 57, with 4 large and 6 escort carriers, remained off the Sakishima Islands to protect the southern flank.

The protracted length of the campaign under stressful conditions forced Admiral Chester W. Nimitz to take the unprecedented step of relieving the principal naval commanders to rest and recuperate. Following the practice of changing the fleet designation with the change of commanders, US naval forces began the campaign as the US 5th Fleet under Admiral Spruance, but ended it as the 3rd Fleet under Admiral Halsey.

Japanese air opposition had been relatively light during the first few days after the landings. However, on 6 April the expected air reaction began with an attack by 400 planes from Kyushu. Periodic heavy air attacks continued through April. During the period 26 March to 30 April, 20 American ships were sunk and 157 damaged by enemy action. By 30 April the Japanese had lost more than 1,100 planes to Allied naval forces alone.

Between 6 April and 22 June, the Japanese flew 1,465 kamikaze aircraft in large-scale attacks from Kyushu, 185 individual kamikaze sorties from Kyushu, and 250 individual kamikaze sorties from Formosa. While US intelligence estimated there were 89 planes on Formosa, the Japanese actually had about 700, dismantled or well camouflaged and dispersed into scattered villages and towns; the US Fifth Air Force disputed Navy claims of kamikaze coming from Formosa.

The ships lost were smaller vessels, particularly the destroyers of the radar pickets, as well as destroyer escorts and landing ships. While no major Allied warships were lost, several fleet carriers were severely damaged. Land-based Shin'yō-class suicide motorboats were also used in the Japanese suicide attacks, although Ushijima had disbanded the majority of the suicide boat battalions before the battle because of expected low effectiveness against a superior enemy. The boat crews were re-formed into three additional infantry battalions.

Operation Ten-Go
Operation Ten-Go (Ten-gō sakusen) was the attempted attack by a strike force of 10 Japanese surface vessels, led by Yamato and commanded by Admiral Seiichi Itō. This small task force had been ordered to fight through enemy naval forces, then beach Yamato and fight from shore, using her guns as coastal artillery and her crew as naval infantry. The Ten-Go force was spotted by submarines shortly after it left the Japanese home waters and was intercepted by US carrier aircraft.

Under attack from more than 300 aircraft over a two-hour span, the world's largest battleship sank on 7 April 1945 after a one-sided battle, long before she could reach Okinawa. (US torpedo bombers were instructed to aim for only one side to prevent effective counter flooding by the battleship's crew, and to aim for the bow or the stern where armor was believed to be the thinnest.) Of Yamatos screening force, the light cruiser  and 4 of the 8 destroyers were also sunk. The Imperial Japanese Navy lost some 3,700 sailors, including Admiral Itō, at the cost of 10 US aircraft and 12 airmen.

British Pacific Fleet
The British Pacific Fleet, taking part as Task Force 57, was assigned the task of neutralizing the Japanese airfields in the Sakishima Islands, which it did successfully from 26 March to 10 April. On 10 April, its attention was shifted to airfields in northern Formosa. The force withdrew to San Pedro Bay on 23 April. On 1 May, the British Pacific Fleet returned to action, subduing the airfields as before, this time with naval bombardment as well as aircraft. Several kamikaze attacks caused significant damage, but as the Royal Navy carriers had armoured flight decks, they experienced only a brief interruption to their force's operations.

Land battle
The land battle took place over about 81 days beginning on 1 April 1945. Subsidiary landings followed, and the Kerama group was secured over the next five days. In these preliminary operations, the 77th Infantry Division suffered 27 dead and 81 wounded, while the Japanese dead and captured numbered over 650. The operation provided a protected anchorage for the fleet and eliminated the threat from suicide boats.

A group of  "Long Tom" artillery pieces went ashore on the islets to cover operations on Okinawa.

Northern Okinawa

The main landing was made by the XXIV Corps and the III Amphibious Corps on the Hagushi beaches on the western coast of Okinawa on 1 April. The 2nd Marine Division conducted a demonstration off the Minatoga beaches on the southeastern coast to deceive the Japanese about American intentions and delay movement of reserves from there.

Tenth Army swept across the south-central part of the island with relative ease, capturing the Kadena and the Yomitan airbases within hours of the landing. In light of the weak opposition, General Buckner decided to proceed immediately with Phase II of his plan, the seizure of northern Okinawa. The 6th Marine Division headed up the Ishikawa Isthmus and by 7 April had sealed off the Motobu Peninsula.

Six days later on 13 April, the 2nd Battalion, 22nd Marine Regiment, reached Hedo Point at the northernmost tip of the island. By this point, the bulk of the Japanese forces in the north (codenamed Udo Force) were cornered on the Motobu Peninsula. The terrain was mountainous and wooded, with the Japanese defenses concentrated on Mount Yaedake, a twisted mass of rocky ridges and ravines on the center of the peninsula. There was heavy fighting before the Marines finally cleared Yaedake on 18 April. However, this was not the end of ground combat in northern Okinawa. On 24 May, the Japanese mounted Operation Gi-gou: a company of Giretsu Kuteitai commandos were airlifted in a suicide attack on Yomitan. They destroyed  of fuel and nine planes before being killed by the defenders, who lost two men.

Meanwhile, the 77th Infantry Division assaulted Ie Shima, a small island off the western end of the peninsula, on 16 April. In addition to conventional hazards, the 77th Infantry Division encountered kamikaze attacks and even local women armed with spears. There was heavy fighting before the area was declared secured on 21 April and became another airbase for operations against Japan.

Southern Okinawa

While the 6th Marine Division cleared northern Okinawa, the US Army 96th and 7th Infantry Divisions wheeled south across the narrow isthmus of Okinawa. By the night of 8 April, American troops had cleared these and several other strongly fortified positions. They suffered over 1,500 battle casualties in the process while killing or capturing about 4,500 Japanese. Yet the battle had only begun, for it was realized that "these were merely outposts," guarding the Shuri Line.

The next American objective was Kakazu Ridge, two hills with a connecting saddle that formed part of Shuri's outer defenses. The Japanese had prepared their positions well and fought tenaciously. The Japanese soldiers hid in fortified caves. American forces often lost personnel before clearing the Japanese out from each cave or other hiding place. The Japanese sent Okinawans at gunpoint out to obtain water and supplies for them, which led to civilian casualties. The American advance was inexorable but resulted in a high number of casualties on both sides.

As the American assault against Kakazu Ridge stalled, Lieutenant General Ushijima—influenced by General Chō—decided to take the offensive. On the evening of 12 April, the 32nd Army attacked American positions across the entire front. The Japanese attack was heavy, sustained, and well organized. After fierce close combat, the attackers retreated, only to repeat their offensive the following night. A final assault on 14 April was again repulsed. The effort led the 32nd Army's staff to conclude that the Americans were vulnerable to night infiltration tactics but that their superior firepower made any offensive Japanese troop concentrations extremely dangerous, and they reverted to their defensive strategy.

The 27th Infantry Division, which had landed on 9 April, took over on the right, along the west coast of Okinawa. Hodge launched a new offensive on 19 April with a barrage of 324 guns, the largest ever in the Pacific Ocean Theater. Battleships, cruisers, and destroyers joined the bombardment, which was followed by 650 Navy and Marine planes attacking the Japanese positions with napalm, rockets, bombs, and machine guns. The Japanese defenses were sited on reverse slopes, where the defenders waited out the artillery barrage and aerial attack in relative safety, emerging from the caves to rain mortar rounds and grenades upon the Americans advancing up the forward slope.

A tank assault to achieve breakthrough by outflanking Kakazu Ridge failed to link up with its infantry support attempting to cross the ridge and therefore failed with the loss of 22 tanks. Although flame tanks cleared many cave defenses, there was no breakthrough, and the XXIV Corps suffered 720 casualties. The losses might have been greater except for the fact that the Japanese had practically all of their infantry reserves tied up farther south, held there by another feint off the Minatoga beaches by the 2nd Marine Division that coincided with the attack.

At the end of April, after Army forces had pushed through the Machinato defensive line, the 1st Marine Division relieved the 27th Infantry Division and the 77th Infantry Division relieved the 96th. When the 6th Marine Division arrived, the III Amphibious Corps took over the right flank and Tenth Army assumed control of the battle.

On 4 May, the 32nd Army launched another counter-offensive. This time, Ushijima attempted to make amphibious assaults on the coasts behind American lines. To support his offensive, the Japanese artillery moved into the open. By doing so, they were able to fire 13,000 rounds in support, but effective American counter-battery fire destroyed dozens of Japanese artillery pieces. The attack failed.

Buckner launched another American attack on 11 May. Ten days of fierce fighting followed. On 13 May, troops of the 96th Infantry Division and 763rd Tank Battalion captured Conical Hill. Meanwhile, on the opposite coast, the 1st and 6th Marine Divisions fought for "Sugar Loaf Hill". The capture of these two key positions exposed the Japanese around Shuri on both sides. Buckner hoped to envelop Shuri and trap the main Japanese defending force.

By the end of May, monsoon rains which had turned contested hills and roads into a morass exacerbated both the tactical and medical situations. The ground advance began to resemble a World War I battlefield, as troops became mired in mud, and flooded roads greatly inhibited evacuation of wounded to the rear. Troops lived on a field sodden by rain, part garbage dump and part graveyard. Unburied Japanese and American bodies decayed, sank in the mud and became part of a noxious stew. Anyone sliding down the greasy slopes could easily find their pockets full of maggots at the end of the journey.

From 24 to 27 May the 6th Marine Division cautiously occupied the ruins of Naha, the largest city on the island, finding it largely deserted.

On 26 May aerial observers saw large troop movements just below Shuri. On 28 May Marine patrols found recently abandoned positions west of Shuri. By 30 May the consensus among Army and Marine intelligence was that the majority of Japanese forces had withdrawn from the Shuri Line. At 10:15 Company A, 1/5 Marines occupied the castle

Shuri Castle had been shelled by the battleship  for three days before this advance. The 32nd Army withdrew to the south and thus the Marines had an easy task of securing Shuri Castle. The castle, however, was outside the 1st Marine Division's assigned zone, and only frantic efforts by the commander and staff of the 77th Infantry Division prevented an American airstrike and artillery bombardment which would have resulted in many friendly fire casualties.

The Japanese retreat, although harassed by artillery fire, was conducted with great skill at night and aided by the monsoon storms. The 32nd Army was able to move nearly 30,000 personnel into its last defense line on the Kiyan Peninsula, which ultimately led to the greatest slaughter on Okinawa in the latter stages of the battle, including the deaths of thousands of civilians. In addition, there were 9,000 IJN troops supported by 1,100 militia, with approximately 4,000 holed up at the underground headquarters on the hillside overlooking the Okinawa Naval Base in the Oroku Peninsula, east of the airfield.

On 4 June, elements of the 6th Marine Division launched an amphibious assault on the peninsula. The 4,000 Japanese sailors, including Admiral Ōta, all committed suicide within the hand-built tunnels of the underground naval headquarters on 13 June. By 17 June, the remnants of Ushijima's shattered 32nd Army were pushed into a small pocket in the far south of the island to the southeast of Itoman.

On 18 June, General Buckner was killed by Japanese artillery fire while monitoring the progress of his troops from a forward observation post. Buckner was replaced by Major General Roy Geiger. Upon assuming command, Geiger became the only US Marine to command a numbered army of the US Army in combat; he was relieved five days later by General Joseph Stilwell. On 19 June, Brigadier General Claudius Miller Easley, the commander of the 96th Infantry Division, was killed by Japanese machine-gun fire, also while checking on the progress of his troops at the front.

The last remnants of Japanese resistance ended on 21 June, although some Japanese continued hiding, including the future governor of Okinawa Prefecture, Masahide Ōta. Ushijima and Chō committed suicide by seppuku in their command headquarters on Hill 89 in the closing hours of the battle. Colonel Yahara had asked Ushijima for permission to commit suicide, but the general refused his request, saying: "If you die there will be no one left who knows the truth about the battle of Okinawa. Bear the temporary shame but endure it. This is an order from your army commander." Yahara was the most senior officer to have survived the battle on the island, and he later authored a book titled The Battle for Okinawa. On 22 June Tenth Army held a flag-raising ceremony to mark the end of organized resistance on Okinawa. On 23 June a mopping-up operation commenced, which concluded on 30 June.

On 15 August 1945, Admiral Matome Ugaki was killed while part of a kamikaze raid on Iheyajima island. The official surrender ceremony was held on 7 September, near the Kadena Airfield.

Casualties

Okinawa was the bloodiest battle of the Pacific War. The most complete tally of deaths during the battle is at the Cornerstone of Peace monument at the Okinawa Prefectural Peace Memorial Museum, which identifies the names of each individual who died at Okinawa in World War II. As of 2022, the monument lists 241,686 names, including 149,611 Okinawans, 77,485 Imperial Japanese soldiers, 14,010 Americans, and smaller numbers of people from South Korea (382), the United Kingdom (82), North Korea (82) and Taiwan (34).

The numbers correspond to recorded deaths during the Battle of Okinawa from the time of the American landings in the Kerama Islands on 26 March 1945 to the signing of the Japanese surrender on 2 September 1945, in addition to all Okinawan casualties in the Pacific War in the 15 years from the Manchurian Incident, along with those who died in Okinawa from war-related events in the year before the battle and the year after the surrender. 234,183 names were inscribed by the time of unveiling, and new names are added as necessary. 40,000 of the Okinawan civilians killed had been drafted or impressed by the Japanese army and are often counted as combat deaths.

Military losses

American

The Americans suffered some 48,000 casualties, not including some 33,000 non-battle casualties (psychiatric, injuries, illnesses), of whom over 12,000 were killed or missing. Killed in action were 4,907 Navy, 4,675 Army, and 2,938 Marine Corps personnel; when excluding naval losses at sea and losses on the surrounding islands (such as Ie Shima), 6,316 killed and over 30,000 wounded occurred on Okinawa proper.  Other authors such as John Keegan have come up with higher numbers.

The most famous American casualty was Lieutenant General Buckner, whose decision to attack the Japanese defenses head-on, although extremely costly in American lives, was ultimately successful. Four days from the closing of the campaign, Buckner was killed by Japanese artillery fire, which blew lethal slivers of coral into his body, while inspecting his troops at the front line. He was the highest-ranking US officer to be killed by enemy fire during the Second World War. The day after Buckner was killed, Brigadier General Easley was killed by Japanese machine gunfire. War correspondent Ernie Pyle was also killed by Japanese machine-gun fire on Ie Shima, a small island just off of northwestern Okinawa.

Aircraft losses over the three-month period were 768 US planes, including those bombing the Kyushu airfields launching kamikazes. Combat losses were 458, and the other 310 were operational accidents. At sea, 368 Allied ships—including 120 amphibious craft—were damaged while another 36—including 15 amphibious ships and 12 destroyers—were sunk during the Okinawa campaign. The US Navy's dead exceeded its wounded, with 4,907 killed and 4,874 wounded, primarily from kamikaze attacks.

American personnel casualties included thousands of cases of mental breakdown. According to the account of the battle presented in Marine Corps Gazette:

Medal of Honor recipients from Okinawa are:
 Beauford T. Anderson – 13 April
 Richard E. Bush – 16 April
 Robert Eugene Bush – 2 May
 Henry A. Courtney Jr. – 14–15 May
 Clarence B. Craft – 31 May
 James L. Day – 14–17 May
 Desmond Doss – 29 April – 21 May
 John P. Fardy – 7 May
 William A. Foster – 2 May
 Harold Gonsalves – 15 April
 William D. Halyburton Jr. – 10 May
 Dale M. Hansen – 7 May
 Louis J. Hauge Jr. – 14 May
 Elbert L. Kinser – 4 May
 Fred F. Lester – 8 June
 Martin O. May – 19–21 April
 Richard M. McCool Jr. – 10–11 June
 Robert M. McTureous Jr. – 7 June
 John W. Meagher – 19 June
 Edward J. Moskala – 9 April
 Joseph E. Muller – 15–16 May
 Alejandro R. Ruiz – 28 April
 Albert E. Schwab – 7 May
 Seymour W. Terry – 11 May

Allied naval vessels damaged and sunk at Okinawa
The following table lists the Allied naval vessels that received damage or were sunk in the Battle of Okinawa between 19 March – 30 July 1945. The table lists a total of 147 damaged ships, five of which were damaged by enemy suicide boats and another five  by mines. During the naval battle, which started before the amphibious landings on Okinawa on 1 April, USS Franklin suffered over 800 killed and missing and USS Bunker Hill suffered 396 killed and missing. These were the first and third largest loss of life on damaged or sunken American aircraft carriers during World War II. The USS Franklin (hit by two bombs in a level bombing attack by a D4Y Judy on 19 March 1945) and USS Bunker Hill were the only two aircraft carriers that sustained very severe damage from Japanese attacks and as a result were the only aircraft carriers in the Essex-class that did not experience any active service after the end of World War II. One source estimated that total Japanese sorties during the entire Okinawa campaign exceeded 3,700, with a large percentage being kamikaze attacks, and that the attackers damaged slightly more than 200 Allied vessels, with 4,900 naval officers and seamen killed and roughly 4,824 wounded or missing. The USS Thorton was damaged as the result of a collision with another US ship.

Those ships in a pink background, and with an asterisk were sunk or had to be scuttled due to irreparable damage. Of those sunk, the majority were relatively smaller ships; these included destroyers of around 300–450 feet. A few small cargo ships were also sunk, several containing munitions which caught fire. Those ships whose names are preceded by "#"  were scrapped or decommissioned as a result of damage.

Japanese losses
The US military estimates that 110,071 Japanese soldiers were killed during the battle. This total includes conscripted Okinawan civilians.

A total of 7,401 Japanese regulars and 3,400 Okinawan conscripts surrendered or were captured during the battle of Okinawa. Additional Japanese and renegade Okinawans were captured or surrendered over the next few months, bringing the total to 16,346. This was the first battle in the Pacific War in which thousands of Japanese soldiers surrendered or were captured. Many of the prisoners were native Okinawans who had been pressed into service shortly before the battle and were less imbued with the Imperial Japanese Army's no-surrender doctrine. When the American forces occupied the island, many Japanese soldiers put on Okinawan clothing to avoid capture, and some Okinawans would come to the Americans' aid by offering to identify these mainland Japanese.

The Japanese lost 16 combat vessels, including the super battleship Yamato. Early claims of Japanese aircraft losses put the total at 7,800, however later examination of Japanese records revealed that Japanese aircraft losses at Okinawa were far below often-repeated US estimates for the campaign. The number of conventional and kamikaze aircraft actually lost or expended by the 3rd, 5th, and 10th Air Fleets, combined with about 500 lost or expended by the Imperial Army at Okinawa, was roughly 1,430. The Allies destroyed 27 Japanese tanks and 743 artillery pieces (including mortars, anti-tank and anti-aircraft guns), some of them eliminated by the naval and air bombardments but most knocked out by American counter-battery fire.

Civilian losses, suicides, and atrocities

Some of the other islands that saw major battles in World War II, such as Iwo Jima, were uninhabited or had been evacuated. Okinawa, by contrast, had a large indigenous civilian population; US Army records from the planning phase of the operation made the assumption that Okinawa was home to about 300,000 civilians. The official US Tenth Army count for the 82-day campaign is a total of 142,058 recovered enemy bodies (including those civilians pressed into service by the Imperial Japanese Army), with the deduction made that about 42,000 were non-uniformed civilians who had been killed in the crossfire. Okinawa Prefecture's estimate is over 100,000 losses.

During the battle, American forces found it difficult to distinguish civilians from soldiers. It became common for them to shoot at Okinawan houses, as one infantryman wrote:
There was some return fire from a few of the houses, but the others were probably occupied by civilians—and we didn't care. It was a terrible thing not to distinguish between the enemy and women and children. Americans always had great compassion, especially for children. Now we fired indiscriminately.

In its history of the war, the Okinawa Prefectural Peace Memorial Museum presents Okinawa as being caught between Japan and the United States. During the battle, the Imperial Japanese Army showed indifference to Okinawans' safety, and its soldiers used civilians as human shields or outright killed them. The Japanese military also confiscated food from the Okinawans and executed those who hid it, leading to mass starvation, and forced civilians out of their shelters. Japanese soldiers also killed about 1,000 people who spoke in the Okinawan language to suppress spying. The museum writes that "some were blown apart by [artillery] shells, some finding themselves in a hopeless situation were driven to suicide, some died of starvation, some succumbed to malaria, while others fell victim to the retreating Japanese troops."

With the impending Japanese defeat, civilians often committed mass suicide, urged on by the Japanese soldiers who told locals that victorious American soldiers would go on a rampage of killing and raping. Ryūkyū Shimpō, one of the two major Okinawan newspapers, wrote in 2007: "There are many Okinawans who have testified that the Japanese Army directed them to commit suicide. There are also people who have testified that they were handed grenades by Japanese soldiers" to blow themselves up. Thousands of civilians, having been induced by Japanese propaganda to believe that American soldiers were barbarians who committed horrible atrocities, killed their families and themselves to avoid capture at the hands of the Americans. Some of them threw themselves and their family members from the southern cliffs where the Peace Museum now resides.

Okinawans "were often surprised at the comparatively humane treatment they received from the American enemy". Islands of Discontent: Okinawan Responses to Japanese and American Power by Mark Selden states that the Americans "did not pursue a policy of torture, rape, and murder of civilians as Japanese military officials had warned". American Military Intelligence Corps combat translators such as Teruto Tsubota managed to convince many civilians not to kill themselves. Survivors of the mass suicides blamed also the indoctrination of their education system of the time, in which the Okinawans were taught to become "more Japanese than the Japanese" and were expected to prove it.

Witnesses and historians claim that soldiers, mainly Japanese troops, raped Okinawan women during the battle. Rape by Japanese troops reportedly "became common" in June, after it became clear that the Imperial Japanese Army had been defeated. Marine Corps officials in Okinawa and Washington have said that they knew of no rapes by American personnel in Okinawa at the end of the war. There are, however, numerous credible testimony accounts which note that a large number of rapes were committed by American forces during the battle. This includes stories of rape after trading sexual favors or even marrying Americans, such as the alleged incident in the village of Katsuyama, where civilians said they had formed a vigilante group to ambush and kill three black American soldiers who they claimed would frequently rape the local girls there.

MEXT textbook controversy

There is ongoing disagreement between Okinawa's local government and Japan's national government over the role of the Japanese military in civilian mass suicides during the battle. In March 2007, the national Ministry of Education, Culture, Sports, Science and Technology (MEXT) advised textbook publishers to reword descriptions that the embattled Imperial Japanese Army forced civilians to kill themselves in the war to avoid being taken prisoner. MEXT preferred descriptions that just say that civilians received hand grenades from the Japanese military. This move sparked widespread protests among Okinawans. In June 2007, the Okinawa Prefectural Assembly adopted a resolution stating, "We strongly call on the (national) government to retract the instruction and to immediately restore the description in the textbooks so the truth of the Battle of Okinawa will be handed down correctly and a tragic war will never happen again."

On 29 September 2007, about 110,000 people held the biggest political rally in the history of Okinawa to demand that MEXT retract its order to textbook publishers regarding revising the account of the civilian suicides. The resolution states, "It is an undeniable fact that the 'multiple suicides' would not have occurred without the involvement of the Japanese military and any deletion of or revision to (the descriptions) is a denial and distortion of the many testimonies by those people who survived the incidents." In December 2007, MEXT partially admitted the role of the Japanese military in civilian mass suicides. The ministry's Textbook Authorization Council allowed the publishers to reinstate the reference that civilians "were forced into mass suicides by the Japanese military", on condition it is placed in sufficient context. The council report states, "It can be said that from the viewpoint of the Okinawa residents, they were forced into the mass suicides." That was not enough for the survivors who said it is important for children today to know what really happened.

The Nobel Prize-winning author Kenzaburō Ōe wrote a booklet that states that the mass suicide order was given by the military during the battle. He was sued by revisionists, including a wartime commander during the battle, who disputed this and wanted to stop publication of the booklet. At a court hearing, Ōe testified "Mass suicides were forced on Okinawa islanders under Japan's hierarchical social structure that ran through the state of Japan, the Japanese armed forces and local garrisons." In March 2008, the Osaka Prefecture Court ruled in favor of Ōe, stating, "It can be said the military was deeply involved in the mass suicides." The court recognized the military's involvement in the mass suicides and murder-suicides, citing the testimony about the distribution of grenades for suicide by soldiers and the fact that mass suicides were not recorded on islands where the military was not stationed.

In 2012, Korean-Japanese director Pak Su-nam announced her work on the documentary Nuchigafu (Okinawan for "only if one is alive") collecting living survivors' accounts to show "the truth of history to many people", alleging that "there were two types of orders for 'honorable deaths'—one for residents to kill each other and the other for the military to kill all residents". In March 2013, Japanese textbook publisher Shimizu Shoin was permitted by MEXT to publish the statements that "Orders from Japanese soldiers led to Okinawans committing group suicide" and "The [Japanese] army caused many tragedies in Okinawa, killing local civilians and forcing them to commit mass suicide."

Aftermath

90% of the buildings on the island were destroyed, along with countless historical documents, artifacts, and cultural treasures, and the tropical landscape was turned into "a vast field of mud, lead, decay and maggots". The military value of Okinawa "exceeded all hope". Okinawa provided a fleet anchorage, troop staging areas, and airfields in proximity to Japan. The US cleared the surrounding waters of mines in Operation Zebra, occupied Okinawa, and set up the United States Civil Administration of the Ryukyu Islands, a form of military government, after the battle. In 2011, one official of the prefectural government told David Hearst of The Guardian:

Effect on the wider war
Because the next major event following the Battle of Okinawa was the total surrender of Japan, the effect of this battle is more difficult to consider. Because Japan surrendered when it did, the anticipated series of battles and the invasion of the Japanese homeland never occurred, and all military strategies on both sides which presupposed this apparently-inevitable next development were immediately rendered moot.

Some military historians believe that the Okinawa campaign led directly to the atomic bombings of Hiroshima and Nagasaki, as a means of avoiding the planned ground invasion of the Japanese mainland. This view is explained by Victor Davis Hanson in his book Ripples of Battle:

Meanwhile, many parties continue to debate the broader question of "why Japan surrendered", attributing the surrender to a number of possible reasons including: the atomic bombings, the Soviet invasion of Manchuria, and Japan's depleted resources.

Memorial
In 1995, the Okinawa government erected a memorial monument named the Cornerstone of Peace in Mabuni, the site of the last fighting in southeastern Okinawa. The memorial lists all the known names of those who died in the battle, civilian and military, Japanese and foreign. As of 2022, the monument lists 241,686 names.

Modern US base
Significant US forces remain garrisoned on Okinawa as the United States Forces Japan, which the Japanese government sees as an important guarantee of regional stability, and Kadena remains the largest US air base in Asia. Local residents have long protested against the size and presence of the base.

See also

 Himeyuri students
 Chiran Special Attack Peace Museum
 History of the Ryukyus
 Josef R. Sheetz
 Rape during the occupation of Japan 
 Suicide in Japan
 Okinawa Memorial Day
 Naval Base Okinawa
 Marine Corps Air Station Futenma
 Camp Hansen
 Torii Station
 Camp Schwab
 Camp Foster
 Camp Kinser
 Giretsu Kuteitai
 Okinawa Prefectural Peace Memorial Museum

References

Citations

Sources 

 
 
 
 
 
 
 
 
 
 
 
 
 
 
 
 
 
 , famous Marine memoir
 
 
  - Firsthand account of the battle by a surviving Japanese officer.

External links 

 
 
 
 
 
 
 US military on the Battle of Okinawa 
 New Zealand account with reference to Operation Iceberg
 Cornerstone of Peace
 Okinawa Prefectural Peace Memorial Museum
 The Peace Learning Archive in OKINAWA
 A photographic record of aircraft carrier HMS Indomitable, 1944–45, including Operation Iceberg, the attack on the Sakashimas
 WWII: Battle of Okinawa  – slideshow by Life magazine
 Operation Iceberg Operational Documents  Combined Arms Research Library, Fort Leavenworth, KS
 Oral history interview with Mike Busha, a member of the 6th Marine Division during the Battle of Okinawa  from the Veterans History Project at Central Connecticut State University
 Oral history interview with Albert D'Amico, a Navy Veteran who was aboard LST 278 during the landing at Okinawa  from the Veterans History Project at Central Connecticut State University
 Booknotes interview with Robert Leckie on Okinawa: The Last Battle of World War II, September 3, 1995.

 
1945 in Japan
Battles of World War II involving New Zealand
Battles of World War II involving Australia
Naval battles of World War II involving Canada
Battles of World War II involving Japan
Battles of World War II involving the United States
History of Okinawa Prefecture
Japan campaign
Murder–suicides in Asia
United States Armed Forces in Okinawa Prefecture
United States Marine Corps in World War II
World War II invasions
World War II operations and battles of the Pacific theatre
Invasions of Japan
Invasions by the United States
Invasions by the United Kingdom
Naval battles and operations of World War II involving the United Kingdom
Amphibious operations of World War II
April 1945 events in Asia
May 1945 events in Asia
June 1945 events in Asia
Amphibious operations involving the United States
Japan–United Kingdom military relations
Itoman, Okinawa